The  is a river in Japan which has its source on Mount Ikeda in Gifu Prefecture. It drains into the Makita River, which ultimately flows into the Kiso River.

River communities
The river passes through or forms the boundary of Ikeda, Ōgaki, Yōrō, and Wanouchi in Gifu Prefecture.

References

Rivers of Gifu Prefecture
Rivers of Japan